Abdelkader Fassi Fehri (Arabic: عبد القادر الفاسي الفهري) is a Moroccan linguist (born 20 April 1947) specialized in the generative syntax of Arabic.  He was Professor of Arabic and Comparative Linguistics at the Faculty of Letters and Human Sciences and Director of the Institute for Study and Research on Arabization at Mohammed V University, and founding President of the Linguistic Society of Morocco.

Reception and influence
In 2006, he won the King Faisal Prize for Arabic Language and Literature.

In 2013, an international conference was held in his honour, in which the Moroccan prime minister Abdelillah Benkirane participated.

References

Linguists from Morocco
Syntacticians
Grammarians of Arabic
1947 births
Living people
People from Fez, Morocco